The Essex Coach was manufactured by the Essex Motor Company in Detroit, Michigan.

Essex Coach specifications (1926 data) 
 Color – Body and wheels, blue; running gear, black
 Seating Capacity – Four or five
 Wheelbase – 110½ inches
 Wheels - Wood
 Tires - 30” × 4.95” balloon
 Service Brakes - contracting on rear
 Emergency Brakes - expanding on rear
 Engine  - Six cylinder, vertical, cast en block, 2-11/16 × 4¼ inches; head removable; valves in side; H.P. 17.32 N.A.C.C. rating
 Lubrication – Splash, with circulating pump
 Crankshaft - Three bearing
 Radiator – Cellular
 Cooling – Thermo-syphon
 Ignition – Storage Battery
 Starting System – Two Unit
 Voltage – Six
 Wiring System – Single
 Gasoline System – Vacuum
 Clutch – Multiple disc in oil
 Transmission – Selective sliding
 Gear Changes – 3 forward, 1 reverse
 Drive – Spiral bevel
 Rear Springs – Semi-elliptic
 Rear Axle – Semi-floating
 Steering Gear – Worm and full worm wheel

Standard equipment
New car price included the following items:
 tools
 jack
 speedometer
 ammeter
 electric horn
 transmission theft lock
 demountable rims
 spare tire carrier
 sun visor
 cowl ventilator
 headlight dimmer

Optional equipment
The following was available at an extra cost:
 none

Prices
New car prices were F.O.B. factory, plus Tax:
 Touring - $850
 Coach - $850

See also
 Essex (automobile)

References
Source: 

Cars of the United States